Patrick Joseph "Dexter" Aylward (12 November 1899 - July 1930) was an American-born Irish hurler. Usually lining out at midfield, he enjoyed All-Ireland Championship success with Kilkenny in 1922 and with Dublin in 1924.

Aylward enjoyed a brief club career with Ballyhale before later joining the C. J. Kickhams club in Dublin. He won his sole county championship medal in 1924.

After being selected for the Kilkenny senior team in 1921, Aylward held his position on the team for the following two championship seasons. He won his first Leinster medal in 1922 before later winning his first All-Ireland medal after Kilkenny's defeat of Tipperary in the final. Aylward later joined the Dublin senior team, with whom he won a second set of Leinster and All-Ireland medals in 1924. His brother, Bob Aylward, later won an All-Ireland medal with Kilkenny in 1939.

Honours

C. J. Kickhams
Dublin Senior Hurling Championship (1): 1924

Kilkenny
All-Ireland Senior Hurling Championship (1): 1922
Leinster Senior Hurling Championship (1): 1922

Dublin
All-Ireland Senior Hurling Championship (1): 1924
Leinster Senior Hurling Championship (1): 1924

References

1890s births
1930 deaths
Emigrants from the United States to Ireland (before 1923)
Ballyhale hurlers
C. J. Kickhams hurlers
Kilkenny inter-county hurlers
Dublin inter-county hurlers
All-Ireland Senior Hurling Championship winners